The New Jersey Chamber of Commerce is an independent business advocacy organization based in Trenton. It represents the interests of many businesses and trade associations. It is not an agency of state or federal government.

In addition to lobbying on behalf of the business community at the New Jersey State House and in Washington, the Chamber provides members with networking events, educational programs and money-saving discounts. Its membership has long been broad-based, ranging from solo proprietors to Fortune 500 companies.

Founding 
In 1911, a group of New Jersey businessmen including Thomas Edison petitioned for the establishment of a state chamber of commerce. They considered governor Woodrow Wilson was pushing policies seen as antagonistic towards business, and were also spurred into action by the 1911 Supreme Court decision ordering a breakup of Standard Oil of New Jersey for contravening antitrust laws.

References

External links 
 njchamber.com

Chambers of commerce in the United States
Economy of New Jersey